Joseph Aloysius "Bo" Sullivan (February 10, 1937 – March 13, 2000) was chairman of the New Jersey Turnpike Authority and a Republican Party politician who sought the nomination for Governor of New Jersey in the 1981 primary.

Early life 
He was born on February 10, 1937. Sullivan played football at Newark Academy and was a 1959 graduate of Princeton University, where he played football and graduated cum laude. He received his law degree in 1964 from Seton Hall University School of Law. Sullivan. After Princeton he worked full-time at his father's firm, Bomont Industries and went to law school at night, earning a degree in 1964.

He was the president and CEO of Bomont Industries, once among the largest manufacturers of typewriter ribbons in the United States. Bomont was founded by Sullivan's father in Totowa, New Jersey; the younger Sullivan took over the firm soon after finishing law school and transitioned the company into a manufacturer of industrial fabrics.

Political career
Sullivan served as Finance Chairman of the Essex County Republican Committee and was a top fundraiser for Ronald Reagan in 1980.

Campaign for governor
In 1980, Sullivan began to plan a campaign for governor of New Jersey. In order to increase his national exposure, Sullivan threw a large party at the 1980 Republican National Convention. A newcomer at the time, he joked that he once had been elected, but it was to be captain of the football team at Newark Academy. Campaigning in 1981, Sullivan eschewed public financing and spent more than $2 million of his own money to win the Republican nomination for governor, but was unsuccessful.  He finished third in an eight-candidate field, behind former Assembly Speaker Thomas Kean and former Paterson Mayor Pat Kramer. His campaign was managed by Karl Ottesen, who had run the stealth U.S. Senate race of Al D'Amato in New York the previous year. The race got a little nasty when the second-generation Irish American Sullivan sort of criticized Kean for his patrician background. In trying to portray Kean as out of touch with common folk, Sullivan ran a TV ad that said "This isn't the kind of guy who would buy you a beer in Bayonne."  Toward the end of the campaign, he received support from key Right to Life groups.

The election results were:

Sullivan won kudos from GOP leaders when he showed up at Kean's victory celebration to offer his support.  Later, he joined Kean for a beer at a Bayonne bar. After Kean won, he named Sullivan as chairman of the New Jersey Turnpike Authority.

Later roles 
He served as New Jersey Co-Chairman of George H. W. Bush's 1988 presidential campaign, and was a part of the Bush transition team recruiting candidates from New Jersey, New York, Pennsylvania, Maryland, and Delaware for federal posts. He was often mentioned as possible United States Ambassador to Ireland under Bush. He was viewed as a likely candidate for governor in 1989, but declined to run.

Death
A resident of Essex Fells, New Jersey, and later of the New Vernon section of Harding Township, New Jersey, Sullivan died at a hospital in Morristown, New Jersey at age 63, following a stroke.

References

Further reading 

1937 births
2000 deaths
New Jersey Republicans
People from Essex Fells, New Jersey
People from Harding Township, New Jersey
20th-century American politicians
Newark Academy alumni
Princeton University alumni
Seton Hall University School of Law alumni
New Jersey Turnpike Authority